The Huesca Offensive was an ill-fated Republican army thrust toward Huesca between 12 and 19 June 1937, during the Spanish Civil War. Hungarian writer and communist commander Máté Zalka was killed in the course of the battle.

Background
In April 1937, the Nationalists started an offensive against the Republican-held Biscay Province, and by the end of May, the Navarrese troops had reached the eastern side of Bilbao's defenses. The Republican government then decided to launch two diversionary offensives on the Aragon and Madrid fronts in order to divert Nationalist troops.

The Offensive
The Republican government decided to launch an attack against the Nationalist held city of Huesca. After the May Days, the Republican forces in the Aragon front had been reorganized and the Republican government established a new Army of the East. This force, under the command of General Pozas, was reinforced with the XII International Brigade, led by General Lukacs, and four brigades from the central front. The Republican forces outnumbered the Nationalist forces besieged in Huesca, but the Nationalist troops were well entrenched and the Republican troops had little artillery and armoured support.

The attack against Huesca started on 12 June, led by Lukács. The Republican troops attacking across open ground were decimated by the machine-gun and artillery fire of the Nationalists. Furthermore, the same day, Lukács was hit by a Nationalist shell and died. The offensive saw the Rakosi Battalion's first action (with 288 men). The battalion became trapped by machine-gun fire and lost a quarter of its men. Their commander, Ákos Hevesi, and political commissar, Imre Tarr, were both killed as they led from the front. On 16 June the Republican troops attacked the villages of Alerre and Chimillas but the assault was repelled by the Nationalist troops. On 19 June, the Nationalists entered Bilbao and the offensive was called off, after other two days of failed Republican assaults.

Aftermath
The Republican troops had heavy casualties (according to Beevor, 9,000), mainly anarchist and POUM members. The failed offensive after the recent May Days in Barcelona, increased the defeatism and the suspicions among the Republican troops in Aragon.

See also 

 List of Spanish Republican military equipment of the Spanish Civil War
 List of Spanish Nationalist military equipment of the Spanish Civil War

References

Bibliography
Beevor, Antony. The Battle for Spain. The Spanish Civil War 1936–1939. Penguin Books. London. 2006. 
Thomas, Hugh. The Spanish Civil War. Penguin Books. London. 2001. 

Battles of the Spanish Civil War
1937 in Spain
Conflicts in 1937
Battles in Aragon
Province of Huesca
June 1937 events